John Christoffersen (20 February 1898 – 13 September 1966) was a Danish wrestler. He competed in the freestyle middleweight and the Greco-Roman middleweight events at the 1924 Summer Olympics.

References

External links
 

1898 births
1966 deaths
Olympic wrestlers of Denmark
Wrestlers at the 1924 Summer Olympics
Danish male sport wrestlers
Sportspeople from Aarhus
20th-century Danish people